Olyreae is a tribe of grasses in the bamboo subfamily (Bambusoideae). Unlike the other two bamboo tribes, Olyreae are herbaceous and do not have a woody stem. Their sister group are the tropical woody bamboos (Bambuseae).

Olyreae grow in the understorey of humid tropical forests. They are mainly distributed in the Neotropics around the Amazon Basin but there is also one species from Africa, Olyra latifolia, and one from New Guinea, Buergersiochloa bambusoides.

The tribe is divided into three subtribes with 21 genera:

References 

Bambusoideae
Poaceae tribes